Compsothyris is a genus of brachiopods belonging to the family Frieleiidae.

The species of this genus are found in southernmost South Hemisphere.

Species:

Compsothyris ballenyi 
Compsothyris racovitzae

References

Brachiopod genera